Folklore and Superstition is the second studio album by Black Stone Cherry.

The band recorded the album at Black Bird Studios, which is owned and operated by country artist Martina McBride, in Nashville, Tennessee. It was produced and mixed by veteran rock producer Bob Marlette (Alice Cooper, Ozzy Osbourne, Saliva, Seether, Shinedown). The album was available for audio streaming through NME as of August 13, 2008, and for general release on August 18. The week beginning the 24th of August, the album reached the number one position in the UK Rock Album Chart in its debut week, and number 23 on the main Top 200 UK Albums Chart. It debuted in Sweden at No. 50.

Track listing

Personnel
Chris Robertson - lead vocals, lead guitar
Ben Wells - rhythm guitar, backing vocals.
Jon Lawhon - bass guitar, backing vocals.
John Fred Young - drums, piano, backing vocals

Charts

Certifications

References

2008 albums
Black Stone Cherry albums
Albums produced by Bob Marlette
Roadrunner Records albums